The Lamborghini Sesto Elemento ("sixth element") is a high-performance limited edition car produced by the Italian automobile manufacturer Lamborghini, which debuted at the 2010 Paris Motor Show. The Sesto Elemento's name is a reference to the atomic number of carbon, referring to the carbon fibre used in its construction.

Design and specifications 
The Sesto Elemento was the first car to use forged carbon fibre (in the tub and suspension arms), a new type of carbon composite developed by Lamborghini and Callaway Golf Company.

The engine is cooled through 10 distinctive hexagonal holes in the engine cover, while two intakes funnel cool air into the mid-mounted engine compartment and the exhaust pipes are positioned in the rear wing.

The interior of the Sesto Elemento is generally bare without vehicle comforts such as air-conditioning and stereo. The Sesto Elemento also lacks seats, instead having foam padding directly adhered to the carbon fibre chassis.

Production 
Lamborghini announced plans to produce 20 cars for track use only in mid-2011 with each car costing US$2.92 million. At that time, the Sesto Elemento was the most expensive Lamborghini ever made, until the Veneno was launched, with the price of the car as high as GB£4,162,150 (US$6.5 million). Due to lack of interest for such an expensive car that was not road legal, Lamborghini was unable to find 20 customers willing to purchase the Sesto Elemento. It is widely believed that Lamborghini ended up producing just 10 Sesto Elemento, rather than the planned 20. This is corroborated through the record keeping of vehicle identification numbers, but has not been admitted publicly by Lamborghini. 

Singapore was the recipient of more cars than any other country with four cars arriving in 2014, though some have since left the country. The United States of America received no Sesto Elementos, though a demonstration chassis resides at the Boeing Everett Factory occasionally on display, as Boeing aided Lamborghini in their carbon fibre development.

References

External links 

 

Sesto
Rear mid-engine, all-wheel-drive vehicles
Cars introduced in 2010